Optics Valley is a region in southern Arizona, centered on Tucson, that is home to a high concentration of optics companies spawned by research at the University of Arizona.  Based on the idea of a technology cluster such as Silicon Valley, Optics Valley is known not only for its optics industry and research but also for the astronomical observatories located in the mountains of southern Arizona where clear skies and isolated peaks make for superior observing conditions.

Research centers

Astronomical observatories

Companies

References

Further reading

External links
 Optics Valley

Geography of Arizona
Optics manufacturing companies
High-technology business districts in the United States
Optics institutions